Letícia Silva is a Brazilian beauty pageant titleholder who was crowned Miss Earth Brazil 2014 that gives her the right to represent Brazil at Miss Earth 2014 in November. She was crowned by Priscilla Martins, Miss Earth Brazil 2013. The crowning moment was presented to the press by CEO of Organização Beleza Nacional, George Sada. OBN is responsible in selecting Miss Terra: Paraná, Santa Catarina, Rio Grande do Sul and São Paulo under the guidelines of Look Top Beauty Productions - organizers of Miss Terra Brasil competition.

References

Brazilian beauty pageant winners
Living people
Miss Earth 2014 contestants
People from Cascavel
Year of birth missing (living people)